The boys' singles tournament of the 2007 European Junior Badminton Championships was held from 4 to 8 April 2007. Rasmus Bonde and Kasper Henriksen from Denmark clinched this title in the last edition.

Seeds 

  Christian John Skovgaard / Christian Larsen (semi-finals)
  Mads Pieler Kolding / Mads Conrad-Petersen (final)
  Peter Käsbauer / Lukas Schmidt (semi-finals)
  Peter Mills / Chris Adcock (champions)

  Zvonimir Đurkinjak / Zvonimir Hölbling (third round)
  Sylvain Grosjean / Laurent Constantin (quarter-finals)
  Georgiy Natarov / Dmytro Zavadsky (third round)
  Paul van Rietvelde / Thomas Bethell (quarter-finals)

Draw

Finals

Top half

Section 1

Section 2

Bottom half

Section 3

Section 4

References

External links 
Tournament Link

2007 European Junior Badminton Championships